John Goldsmith (born 17 June 1931) is a former  Australian rules footballer who played with Geelong in the Victorian Football League (VFL).

Notes

External links 

Living people
1931 births
Australian rules footballers from Victoria (Australia)
Geelong Football Club players
Hamilton Imperials Football Club players